

From 50,000 to 59,999 

 50000 Quaoar
 
 
 
 
 
 
 
 
 
 
 50719 Elizabethgriffin
 
 
 
 
 
 
 
 
 
 
 
 
 
 
 
 
 
 
 
 
 
 
 
 51823 Rickhusband
 51824 Mikeanderson
 51825 Davidbrown
 51826 Kalpanachawla
 51827 Laurelclark
 51828 Ilanramon
 51829 Williemccool
 
 
 51983 Hönig
 
 
 
 
 
 
 
 
 
 
 52246 Donaldjohanson
 
 
 52266 Van Flandern
 
 
 
 
 
 
 
 
 
 
 
 
 
 
 
 
 
 
 
 
 
 
 
 
 
 
 
 
 
 
 
 
 
 
 
 
 
 52872 Okyrhoe
 
 52975 Cyllarus
 
 
 
 
 
 
 
 
 
 
 
 53311 Deucalion
 
 
 
 
 
 
 
 
 
 
 
 
 
 
 54509 YORP
 
 
 
 
 54598 Bienor
 
 
 
 
 
 
 
 
 
 
 
 
 
 
 
 
 
 
 
 
 
 
 
 
 
 
 
 
 
 
 
 
 
 
 
 
 55576 Amycus
 
 
 
 
 
 
 
 
 
 
 
 
 
 
 
 
 
 
 
 
 
 
 
 
 
 
 
 
 
 
 
 
 
 
 
 
 
 
 
 57424 Caelumnoctu
 
 
 
 
 57868 Pupin
 
 
 
 
 
 58097 Alimov
 
 
 
 
 
 
 
 
 
 
 
 
 
 
 
 
 
 
 
 
 
 
 
 
 
 
 
 
 
 58534 Logos

See also 
 List of minor planet discoverers
 List of observatory codes

References

External links 
 Discovery Circumstances: Numbered Minor Planets, Minor Planet Center

Lists of minor planets by name